Derker is a stop on the Oldham and Rochdale Line (ORL) of Greater Manchester's light-rail Metrolink system. It opened to passengers on 16 December 2012 and is located in the Derker area of Oldham, England.

History
Derker railway station was opened, initially on an experimental basis, on 30 August 1985 by British Rail to replace  station, ½ mile further along the line.

The station closed on 3 October 2009, was converted to light rail, and re-opened as Derker Metrolink station on 16 December 2012. The station is served by a 254 space Park and Ride car park, which is immediately adjacent to the station and is accessed from Cromford Street.

Service pattern 

References

External links

Metrolink stop information
Derker area map

Tram stops in the Metropolitan Borough of Oldham
Railway stations opened by British Rail
Railway stations in Great Britain opened in 1985
Railway stations in Great Britain closed in 2009
Railway stations in Great Britain opened in 2012
Tram stops on the East Didsbury to Rochdale line